Çayırova may refer to:
 Ayios Theodhoros, Famagusta, Cyprus
 Çayırova District, Kocaeli, Turkey